Toarn is a Christian metal band formed in Everett, Washington in 2009.

Background
Toarn formed in November 2009. In February 2012, the band released Protoevangelium. The group worked with musical producer and YouTuber Jared Dines on the Protoevangelium album. The band released Brood of Vipers through Itchy Metal Records in 2013. In June 2016, the band signed to Luxor Records and released Giant Killer in July 2016. The band consists of Vocalist Michael Roberts, Guitarist Justin Wanless, Bassist Ian Vanzant, and Drummer Taylor Cort. The band also had Bassist Alex Carr from 2009 to 2013. In 2017, the band released a new single, "Blackened Eyes", off their upcoming album, The Dying Flame.

Members
Current
Justin Wanless - guitar (2009-present)
Michael Roberts - vocals (2009-present)
Ian Vanzant - bass (2019)
Taylor Cort - drums (2009-present)

Former
 Alex Karr - bass 
Kyle Norton - guitar
James Kolstedt - bass
 Alejandro Becerra - guitar
 Joel Teague - guitar
 Nate Mircovich - bass

Live
 Seth Adam - bass (2017-present)

Discography
Studio albums
Protoevangelium (February 2012)
The Dying Flame (November 30, 2017; Luxor)

EPs
Brood of Vipers (April 2013; Itchy Metal)
Giant Killer (July 15, 2016; Luxor)

Singles
"Flander's Field" (2016)
"Giant Killer" (2016)
"Blackened Eyes" (2017)

Compilation appearances
 The Bearded Dragon's Sampler: Third Times a Charm (2017; The Bearded Dragon Productions)

References

American Christian metal musical groups
Musical groups established in 2009
Luxor Records artists